Curavacas is a peak which is part of the Cantabrian Mountains system of mountain ranges. This landform is located in Triollo municipality, in Province of Palencia and in Castile and León autonomous community. Its height is 2,524 metres.

References 

Cantabrian Mountains